Ménil-Hubert-en-Exmes is a commune in the Orne department in northwestern France.

See also
Communes of the Orne department

References

Menilhubertenexmes